Janusz Kurczab (6 September 1937 – 11 April 2015) was a Polish fencer, mountaineer and expedition leader. He competed in the individual and team épée events at the 1960 Summer Olympics. Expert in the history of Himalayism, editor of the online climbing website wspinanie.pl. Responsible for the creation of a Central Mountain Archives in the multimedia mountain center "Crown of the Earth" (pl. Centrum Górskie Korona Ziemi) in Zawoja. 

Kurczab led a Polish expedition in 1976 that tackled the Northeast ridge of K2. However, the team was not able to summit due to poor weather conditions and failing health among several expedition members.

References

1937 births
2015 deaths
Polish male fencers
Polish mountain climbers
Olympic fencers of Poland
Fencers at the 1960 Summer Olympics
Fencers from Warsaw
21st-century Polish people
20th-century Polish people